This is a list of submissions to the 53rd Academy Awards for Best Foreign Language Film. The Academy Award for Best Foreign Language Film was created in 1956 by the Academy of Motion Picture Arts and Sciences to honour non-English-speaking films produced outside the United States. The award is handed out annually, and is accepted by the winning film's director, although it is considered an award for the submitting country as a whole. Countries are invited by the Academy to submit their best films for competition according to strict rules, with only one film being accepted from each country.

For the 53rd Academy Awards, twenty-six films were submitted in the category Academy Award for Best Foreign Language Film. Cameroon, Colombia, Iceland and Portugal all submitted films for the first time. Iceland has submitted a film every year since then, while Cameroon did not submit again until 2017. The highlighted titles were the five nominated films, which came from France, Hungary, Japan and Spain. The Soviet Union won the award with the film Moscow Does Not Believe in Tears.

Submissions

References

Sources
 Margaret Herrick Library, Academy of Motion Picture Arts and Sciences

53